Blue Beetle is a long running comic book series that was first published by Fox Feature Syndicate before being a Charlton Comics title and currently a DC Comics title. The series starred certain characters with the same name.

Fox Feature Syndicate and Holyoke Publishing
The original Blue Beetle comic first appeared in Winter 1940 by Fox Feature Syndicate and Holyoke Publishing. It starred the original Blue Beetle named Dan Garret who first appeared in Mystery Men Comics anthology comic book series. He was depicted as a police officer who secretly dons a superhero costume to thwart crime. The series was the second featured title of a superhero in American comic book magazines after Superman having his own series. The volume series lasted until August 1950 with issue #60 when the company of Fox Feature Syndicate collapsed.

The character was revised and reprinted briefly by Charlton Comics with issues #18-#20.

Charlton Comics
In 1964, Charlton modernized the Blue Beetle title. Instead of Dan Garret, he was renamed Dan Garrett. Also instead of a policeman he was an archeologist who discovered the ancient mystical scarab which gave him multiple superpowers. The series lasted five issues through March–April 1965. The Dan Garrett version would briefly be revised again in July 1965 throughout February–March 1966, lasting another five issues.

After the popularity of Charlton's new Blue Beetle named Ted Kord that was introduced in the back up feature of Captain Atom solo series in issue #83. Ted had his own series by Charlton which also lasted five issues  between June 1967 and November 1968.

DC Comics
DC Comics acquired Charlton in the mid-1980s. They then revised Ted Kord with collaboration from Len Wein and Paris Cullins that lasted until issue #24 in May 1988.

After the death of Ted Kord, a new Blue Beetle was introduced named Jaime Reyes in Infinite Crisis #3. His own solo series begun in issue #1 and ended in issue #36 in February 2009.

After The New 52 was launched, a new series starring Jaime Reyes was introduced. It launched in November 2011 and ended in March 2013.

DC Comics once again relaunched its titles with DC Rebirth and featured Reyes in his new series that lasted in April 2018.

Collected editions

References

1940 comics debuts
1950 comics endings
1955 comics debuts
1955 comics endings
1964 comics debuts
1965 comics endings
1965 comics debuts
1966 comics endings
1967 comics debuts
1968 comics endings
1986 comics debuts
1988 comics endings
2006 comics debuts
2009 comics endings
2011 comics debuts
2013 comics endings
2016 comics debuts
Fox Feature Syndicate titles
Charlton Comics titles
DC Comics titles
Blue Beetle
Golden Age comics titles